Alomya is a genus of the parasitic wasp family Ichneumonidae.

Species
 Alomya cheni He & Chen, 1990 
 Alomya debellator (Fabricius, 1775) 
 Alomya japonica Uchida, 1929 
 Alomya punctulata (Schellenberg, 1802) 
 Alomya pygmaea Heinrich 
 Alomya semiflava Stephens, 1835 
 Alomya telenga Abdinbekova, 1961

References
Biolib

Ichneumonidae genera